The following is a list of events affecting Philippine television in 1982. Events listed include television show debuts, finales, cancellations, and channel launches, closures and rebrandings, as well as information about controversies and carriage disputes.

Premieres

Unknown
 Ang Batasan on MBS 4
 Meet the Press on MBS 4
 Love, Lea on MBS 4
 Penthouse Seven on GMA 7
 Kapiteryang Pinoy on RPN 9

 Dance 10 on RPN 9
 News at Seven Cebu on GMA Cebu
 9 to 5 on GMA 7

Programs transferring networks

Finales
 January 1: Nang Dahil sa Pag-Ibig on GMA
 August 22: Penthouse Seven on GMA
 December 27: Quincy, M.E. (season 7) on GMA
 December 30: [[CHiPs|CHiPS (season 5)]] on GMA

Unknown
 Geym na Geym on RPN 9
 Barkada sa 9 on RPN 9
 Charlie's Angels'' on GMA 7

Births
April 18 - Franzen Fajardo
May 12 – Donnie Nietes
May 17 – Kaye Abad
June 2 – Wendy Valdez
June 16 – Jodi Sta. Maria
July 23 – Zanjoe Marudo
August 12 – Iza Calzado
October 4 – Grace Lee
October 10 - Erik Santos
November 29 – Paolo Ballesteros

See also
1982 in television

References

 
Television in the Philippines by year
Philippine television-related lists